The Hogs may refer to:
 The Arkansas Razorbacks, the mascot of the University of Arkansas in Fayetteville, Arkansas
 The Hogs (American football), the offensive line of the Washington Redskins of the National Football League during the 1980s and early 1990s

See also
 Hog (disambiguation)